Neil Broad and Stefan Kruger were the defending champions but did not compete that year.

Andrew Castle and Nduka Odizor won in the final 7–6, 6–2 against Alexander Mronz and Michiel Schapers.

Seeds

  Tom Nijssen /  Mark Woodforde (quarterfinals)
  Goran Ivanišević /  Petr Korda (quarterfinals)
  Paul Annacone /  Shelby Cannon (semifinals)
  Udo Riglewski /  Michael Stich (quarterfinals)

Draw

References
 1990 Australian Men's Hardcourt Championships Doubles Draw

Next Generation Adelaide International
Australian Men's Hardcourt Championships
1990 in Australian tennis